Ernest E. L. Hammer (December 17, 1884 – March 10, 1970) was an American lawyer, politician, and judge from New York.

Life 
Hammer was born on December 17, 1884 in the Harlem district of New York City, New York, the son of Ernest E. Hammer and Catherine C. Tyrrell.

Hammer lived in the Bronx since 1890, where his father worked as a builder as well as a consultant. He attended St. Jerome's School and graduated from St. Francis Xavier High School, the University of Notre Dame in Indiana with an A.B., and New York Law School with an LL.B. He was admitted to the bar in 1906 and began practicing law, handling important litigated and business transactions in the Bronx. He was a member of the law firm Healy & Hammer with former Assistant Corporation Counsel Ellsworth J. Healy, with law offices at 37 Liberty Street. He was chairman of the Committee of the Committee on Legislation of the Committee of the Democratic County General Committee of the County of the Bronx. In 1912, he was elected to the New York State Assembly as a Democrat, representing the New York County 35th District. He served in the Assembly in 1913.

In the Assembly, Hammer was active in supporting numerous labor reform laws. When the Bronx became a county in 1914, he was appointed Public Administrator. He served in that office until 1926, when he was elected Justice of the New York Supreme Court. He was re-elected to the Court in 1940 and 1954 with endorsements from all parties. As Justice, he presided over, among other notable cases, the proceedings that led to the extradition of Richard Hauptmann to New Jersey, where Hauptmann was later put to death for the Lindbergh kidnapping. He also presided over various labor-management proceedings, with the head of the state's American Federation of Labor praising his pro-labor stance at one point. He served on the Court until he reached the statutory retirement age of 70 in 1954. He began residing in Bayport during the summer in 1924, and in March 1969 he moved to Sayville.

Active in promoting the growth of the Bronx, Hammer was a charter member of the Bronx Rotary Club, the Board of Trade, and the Chamber of Commerce. He helped plan the Concourse Plaza Hotel, the first hotel in the borough, and headed a committee that planned the Bronx County Building. He became a trustee for the Lavelle School for the Blind in 1928, and from 1951 to 1966 he served as president of the board. A notable Catholic layman, he received Papal appointments as a Knight of Malta and Knight of the Holy Sepulchre, was rewarded with the Pro Ecclesia et Pontifice and the Gold Cross of Jerusalem, and served as president of the board of governors of the Catholic Lawyers Guild.

Hammer was an executive committee member of the Fordham Club and chairman of its public improvements committee. He was a member of the Sedgwick Club, the North End Democratic Club, the Notre Dame Club of New York, the Cardinal's Committee of Laity, the Friendly Sons of St. Patrick, the Catholic Club, the American Bar Association, the New York State Bar Association, the New York City Bar Association, the Bronx County Bar Association, the American Museum of Art, and the N.D.U. Alumni Association. He was also honorary life president of the Lacedaemonian Society and a fourth degree master of the Knights of Columbus, and received an honorary LL.D. degree from Manhattan College in 1953 and an honorary degree from Notre Dame in 1954. He was married to Alice M. Prendergast, niece of Archbishop of Philadelphia Edmond Francis Prendergast. Their children were Rev. Edmond F. P., Ernest E. L., Jeanne, and Harry F.X. Hammer

Hammer died in Brookhaven Memorial Hospital in Patchogue on March 10, 1970. He was buried in Gate of Heaven Cemetery.

References

External links 

 The Political Graveyard

1884 births
1970 deaths
People from Harlem
Politicians from the Bronx
Xavier High School (New York City) alumni
University of Notre Dame alumni
New York Law School alumni
20th-century American lawyers
Lawyers from New York City
20th-century American politicians
Democratic Party members of the New York State Assembly
20th-century American judges
New York Supreme Court Justices
Catholics from New York (state)
Knights of Malta
Knights of the Holy Sepulchre
People from Bayport, New York
People from Sayville, New York
Burials at Gate of Heaven Cemetery (Hawthorne, New York)